Bakayoko is a surname of Ivorian origin, and may refer to:

 Amadou Bakayoko (born 1996), Sierra Leonean professional footballer
 Gaousso Bakayoko (born 1991), Ivorian footballer
 Hamed Bakayoko (1965–2021), Ivorian politician
 Ibrahima Bakayoko (born 1976), Ivorian footballer
 Johan Bakayoko (born 2003), Belgian footballer
 Ramata Ly-Bakayoko (born 1955), Ivorian academic and government official
 Tiémoué Bakayoko (born 1994), French footballer
 Youssouf Bakayoko (born 1943), Minister for Foreign Affairs of Côte d'Ivoire